Giovanni Battista Sighicelli (died 1575) was a Roman Catholic prelate who served as Bishop of Faenza (1562–1575).

On 18 March 1562, Giovanni Battista Sighicelli was appointed during the papacy of Pope Pius IV as Bishop of Faenza.
Native of San Giovanni in Persiceto, he served as Bishop of Faenza until his death on 12 July 1575.

References

External links and additional sources
 (for Chronology of Bishops) 
 (for Chronology of Bishops)  

16th-century Italian Roman Catholic bishops
Bishops appointed by Pope Pius IV
1575 deaths